In the male, the peritoneum encircles the sigmoid colon, from which it is reflected to the posterior wall of the pelvis as a fold, the sigmoid mesocolon. It then leaves the sides and, finally, the front of the rectum, and is continued on to the upper ends of the seminal vesicles and the bladder; on either side of the rectum it forms a fossa, the pararectal fossa, which varies in size with the distension of the rectum.

External links
  - "The Female Pelvis: Distribution of the Peritoneum in the Female Pelvis"

References

Abdomen